Kleinpritzer See is a lake in Ludwigslust-Parchim, Mecklenburg-Vorpommern, Germany. At an elevation of 36.6 m, its surface area is 2.42 km².

Lakes of Mecklenburg-Western Pomerania